Mykhailo-Kotsiubynske is an urban-type settlement in Chernihiv Raion, Chernihiv Oblast, Ukraine. It hosts the administration of Mykhailo-Kotsiubynske settlement hromada, one of the hromadas of Ukraine. Population: 

The current name of the settlement commemorates the writer Mykhailo Kotsiubynsky.

Economy

Transportation
The closest railway station is Levkovychi, a couple of kilometers north of the settlement, on the railway line connecting Chernihiv and Slavutych.

Mykhailo-Kotsiubynske is on a road which runs from Chernihiv to the west, crosses into Belarus and proceeds to Mazyr.

References

Chernigovsky Uyezd
Urban-type settlements in Chernihiv Raion